Gruit (alternately grut or gruyt) is a herb mixture used for bittering and flavouring beer, popular before the extensive use of hops. The terms gruit and grut ale may also refer to the beverage produced using gruit.

Historically, gruit is the term used in an area today covered by the Netherlands, Belgium, and westernmost Germany.  Today, however, gruit is a colloquial term for any beer seasoned with gruit-like herbs.

Gruit is a combination of herbs, commonly including:
Common heather (Calluna vulgaris). 
Ground ivy (Glechoma hederacea)
Horehound (Marrubium vulgare)
Mugwort (Artemisia vulgaris)
Sweet gale (Myrica gale)
Yarrow (Achillea millefolium)
 
Gruit varied somewhat; each gruit producer included different herbs to produce unique flavors and effects. 
Other adjunct herbs include juniper berries, ginger, caraway seed, aniseed, nutmeg, cinnamon, mint, and occasionally hops in variable proportions (although gruit today is often sought out for lacking hops).

Historical context
The word "gruit" stems from an area now in the Netherlands, Belgium and northwestern Germany. The word could also refer to the herb mixture itself or the monopoly of its sale. During the 11th century, the Holy Roman Emperor Henry IV awarded monopoly privileges of the production and sale of gruit (Grutgerechtigkeit, or gruit license) to different local authorities, and as such was a de facto tax on beer.  It is believed that Henry IV awarded the German clergymen the exclusive right to produce and tax gruit in order to gain the clergy's support throughout the Holy Roman Empire. The control of gruit restricted entry to local beer markets - brewers in a diocese were not allowed to sell beer brewed without the local gruit, and imports were similarly restricted. The gruit licensing system also exerted control over brewers within a city, as the holder of a Grutgerechtigkeit could calculate how much beer each brewer could make based on how much gruit was sold to them. Specific gruit recipes were often guarded secrets. In 1420, the town council of Cologne "directed a knowledgeable woman to teach a certain brewer, and no one else, how to make [gruit]." 

The earliest reference to gruit dates from the late 10th century, and although largely replaced by hops in the 14th and 15th centuries, gruit beer was locally produced in Westphalia until the 17th century.

Outside the area where the gruit monopoly applied, other countries and regions produced ales containing spices, but they were not named gruit. For instance, some traditional types of unhopped beer such as sahti in Finland, which is spiced with juniper berries and twigs, have survived the advent of hops.

In both the area where gruit existed and outside it, the traditional spices were gradually replaced by hops, in a slow sweep across Europe occurring between the 11th century (in the south and east of the Holy Roman Empire) and the late 16th century (Great Britain).

In 16th-century Britain, a distinction was made between "ale", which was unhopped, and "beer", brought by Dutch merchants, which was hopped. 

In more recent centuries, however, ale, the words "beer" and "ale" have been synonymous, as is still largely the case in British English, though recently there has been an increase in a use, originating in the United States, where "ale" means beer other than lager beer.

The main factor for the replacement of spices by hops is that hops were cheaper (especially in the gruit area, where the price of beer flavouring spices was artificially kept high) and were better at rendering the beer more stable. This preservative effect is thought to have had a large impact on the early movement to switch over, although other plants commonly used in gruit mixes, for example sage, rosemary, or bog myrtle, also have antiseptic properties likely to extend the shelf life of beer.

Spruce tips as a local food ingredient have a practical aspect, as well; it is a plentiful resource in northern latitudes such as Alaska, whereas hops must be imported from the lower 48 United States.

Modern brews
The 1990s microbrewery movement in North America and Europe renewed interest in unhopped beers, and several have tried reviving ales brewed with gruits, or plants that once were used in it. Commercial examples include:

Since 2013, craft brewers with an interest in making gruit ales have banded together to mark 1 February as International Gruit Day. The day is intended to raise awareness of and pay homage to the historical traditions of brewing with botanicals.

See also

 Adjuncts
 Sahti
 Spruce beer
 Witbier

References

Books

Further reading

External links
Gruit history, brewing and recipes at gruitale.com
Gruit recipe from Patrick Kaeding
Vanberg & DeWulf profile of Posca Rustica

Types of beer
Brewing ingredients
Herbs